Håkon Solem (10 July 1908 – 7 December 1993) was a Norwegian sailor. He was born in Kristiania. He competed at the 1948 Summer Olympics in London, where he placed fourth in the 6 metre class, together with Magnus Konow, Ragnar Hargreaves, Anders Evensen and Lars Musæus.

References

External links

1908 births
1993 deaths
Sportspeople from Oslo
Norwegian male sailors (sport)
Olympic sailors of Norway
Sailors at the 1948 Summer Olympics – 6 Metre